Willie Nile (born Robert Noonan; June 7, 1948) is an American singer-songwriter.

In 1980, Nile released his self-titled debut album. His early career was interrupted by various problems, but he eventually returned to recording and performing in the US and Europe, establishing himself as a singer-songwriter.

Early life
Born in Buffalo, New York, into what he called "a gregarious Irish Catholic family". He grew up with two older brothers who played piano, and a mother who "used to always have music in the house. Whether it was classical or big band or popular hits of the times, something was always playing." His grandfather ran an orchestra in Buffalo and was a vaudeville pianist who played with Bill "Bojangles" Robinson and Eddie Cantor.

Nile studied philosophy at the University at Buffalo and lived in Greenwich Village while beginning his music career. He contracted pneumonia and wrote songs while he spent a year recuperating. Afterward, he began frequenting such clubs as CBGB, where he saw performers including Patti Smith, Television, the Ramones, and Talking Heads.

Career

Early years
Nile established residency at Kenny's Castaways, a Greenwich Village club, where he was discovered by New York Times music critic Robert Palmer who described Nile as "the most gifted songwriter to emerge from the New York folk scene in some while". This led to a meeting with Clive Davis and a record deal with Arista Records. He went into the studio with a band that included Jay Dee Daugherty from the Patti Smith Group and Fred Smith from Television.  He was described by Stephen Holden of the New York Times as a "live wire" in concerts.

Following the release of his debut album, Willie Nile, he joined The Who's 1980 summer tour.

After his second album 1981's Golden Down, Nile became involved with protracted legal problems which curtailed his career for a number of years.

Re-emergence
Although he continued to write, Nile did not perform live or record again until a 1987 performance in Oslo, Norway, with Eric Andersen. A videotape of Nile's performance in Norway prompted a Columbia talent scout to sign him to the label in 1988. For reasons that are unclear, production on his album didn't start for two more years. It was another significant delay in the troubadour's career. Issued in 1991, His Columbia Records CD Places I Have Never Been contained the songs "Everybody Needs A Hammer" and "Heaven Help The Lonely." Places I Have Never Been featured appearances by backing musicians including Richard Thompson, Loudon Wainwright III, Roger McGuinn, and members of the Hooters and the Roches. On June 11, 1991, Nile was the guest musician on the Late Night with David Letterman show. 
 
Nile has recorded and performed with several musicians, including Ringo Starr, Tori Amos, Elvis Costello, Lucinda Williams, Ian Hunter, and Barenaked Ladies. A live Central Park concert album, Willie Nile-Archive Alive, was released on Archive Recordings, and Nile was one of the vocalists on the 1998 ensemble album Largo, along with Joan Osborne, Cyndi Lauper, Levon Helm, The Chieftains, Taj Mahal and Carole King. Another project found Nile writing and performing most of the songs for the soundtrack to the Kevin McLaughlin film Pinch Me!.

Gathering together his resources over time, he put out his first self-released album, Beautiful Wreck of the World, in 1999. It was chosen as one of the Top Ten Albums of the Year by critics at Billboard Magazine, The Village Voice and Stereo Review.

Lucinda Williams called "On the Road to Calvary," Nile's song for Jeff Buckley, "One of the most beautiful songs I've ever heard." The album reached the finals of the Independent Music Awards for Best Rock Album of the Year.

21st-century renaissance

In the fall of 2003, Nile was invited to share the stage at three concerts with the E Street Band, including the two final Giants Stadium shows as well as the two last shows of that particular tour at Shea Stadium.

In 2006, Nile released Streets of New York, which some may consider to be his best work to date, due to its production and songwriting. Former Time magazine music critic and Academy Award-winning screenwriter Jay Cocks writes of Streets of New York, "The tunes he writes and plays with such blowtorch vibrancy get the myth and magic and danger and sadness and love in this town—of this town—truer, and righter, than anything I've heard since Dion. This record is a head-twister and heart-wrencher.  It's rock and roll at its best. It's New York at its best. And there's nothing better than that."

House of a Thousand Guitars was released to positive reviews on April 14, 2009.

On November 22, 2009, Nile joined the E Street Band for the cover of Jackie Wilson's "Higher and Higher".

On April 23, 2013, at a ceremony in Leeds, UK, Nile was named Legacy Ambassador for the Buddy Holly Educational Foundation.

On June 25, 2013, Nile releases his eighth full-length studio album, American Ride through Loud & Proud Records. Nile originally had planned on self-distributing through money raised on PledgeMusic.com. The decision to sign onto a record label occurred after he was approached by Tom Lipsky, president of Loud & Proud Records.

On November 11, 2014, Nile released If I Was a River, a 10-track all piano album, composed by Nile with assistance from his long-time collaborator Frankie Lee.

At a surprise appearance at the 2015 Light of Day Benefit in Asbury Park, New Jersey, Bruce Springsteen joined Nile on stage to perform Nile's "One Guitar". On May 28, 2015, at the Best Buy Theatre in New York City, Nile joined Springsteen, Joan Jett, Roger Daltrey and Billy Idol at the 11th annual MusiCares MAP Fund benefit concert to honor Pete Townshend for his commitment to helping other musicians with addictions.

On July 27, 2018, Nile released the album Children of Paradise. The album was well received and given excellent reviews. Associated Press' Kiley Armstrong says it is "his best album to date".
In a July 2018 review of the album Audiophilie says "Willie Nile has a lot to say and clearly some great songs in his back pocket. You just need to listen. If you have even a bit of conscience remaining, you should listen to Willie's albums of the last 10 years or so. You might just get inspired by his 21st century renaissance".

On March 15, 2020, Nile released his 13th studio album, New York at Night.  Nile described it as "throwing another long on the fire", defining his passion for his music.  Along with the title track, the album includes the previously released "Run Free", "New York is Rockin'" which he co-wrote with Curtis Stigers for Stigers' 1995 album Time Was, "Surrender the Moon", a song he started with his brother John, who died years ago, and reflections on love; "A Little Bit of Love", "The Last Time We Made Love", and "Downtown Girl".American Songwriter magazine rated the album 3½ of 5 stars and said that Nile belongs in a class of New York songwriters with Dion. Lou Reed, Patti Smith, Garland Jeffreys, The Ramones, New York Dolls and others. Giving the album an 88/100 rating, Elmore Magazine says "Jersey has Bruce Springsteen, but New York has Willie Nile".

In 2022, Nile's 2006 album Streets of New York was chosen "Classic American Album" by David Jarman of Americana-UK.

Band members
Current members
 Jimi K. Bones – guitar
 Johnny Pisano  – electric and upright bass, backing vocals
Jon Weber – drums

Former members
Brad Albetta – electric & acoustic Bass
 Matt Hogan – lead guitar
 Alex Alexander – drums, percussion
 Clay Barnes – guitars
 Jay Dee Daugherty – drums and percussion
 Peter Hoffman  – guitars
Rich Pagano – drums, percussion, background vocals
 Fred Smith – bass
 Andy York – lead guitar, background vocals

Discography

Studio albums

Other releases

Other appearances

Awards
1980 Sterio Review Magazine - Willie Nile - Record of the Year
2005 Nile was inducted into the Buffalo Music Hall of Fame.
2013 Winner - AIM Independent Music Awards: "One Guitar" – Best Social Action Song
2013 Nominee - AIM Independent Music Awards: "The Innocent Ones" - Best Album Rock/Hard Rock
2014 Nominee - AIM Independent Music Awards: "American Ride" - Best Album Rock/Hard Rock
2018 Nominee - AIM Independent Music Awards: "Earth Blues" - Best Social Action Short Form Music Video

References

External links
Willie Nile Official Website

1948 births
Living people
American male singer-songwriters
American rock singers
American rock songwriters
American rock pianists
American male pianists
American alternative rock musicians
American people of Irish descent
University at Buffalo alumni
Musicians from Buffalo, New York
Singer-songwriters from New York (state)
People from Greenwich Village
20th-century American pianists
21st-century American pianists
20th-century American male musicians
21st-century American male musicians